William Samuel Wright (born 1914) was an English professional footballer who played as a full-back.

Career statistics
Source:

References

1914 births
Sportspeople from Hanley, Staffordshire
English footballers
Association football fullbacks
Milton True Blues F.C. players
Stoke City F.C. players
Burton Town F.C. players
Port Vale F.C. players
Glentoran F.C. players
Barrow A.F.C. players
English Football League players
Year of death missing